Australia first competed at the Games, then titled the British Empire Games, in 1930; and is one of only six countries to have sent athletes to every Commonwealth Games. The others are Canada, England, New Zealand, Scotland, and Wales. Australian athletes competed for Australasia at the 1911 Festival of the Empire, the forerunner to the British Empire Games.

Five of the 21 games have been hosted by Australia, with the city of Gold Coast hosting the 2018 Commonwealth Games.

Australia has placed first at 13 out of the 21 games (compared with England 7 and Canada 1) and has been in the top three for all meets except the first games in 1930.

In all but one of the 18 Commonwealth Games held so far (excluding the 1978 Games), the Australian flag bearer has gone on to win a gold medal.

List of Games Host Nation Bids

Games Staged

Australia has hosted the Commonwealth Games on four occasions but have only won once via an international vote. That vote was for the host of the 2018 games, won by the Gold Coast.

Sydney 1938 was simply awarded.

Perth 1962 was a contest between Adelaide and Perth which Adelaide originally won at the 1956 Summer Olympics in Melbourne, Australia. Adelaide first won 13 votes to Perth's 3. Two years later that was overturned by the Australian Commonwealth Games Association prior to the 1958 British Empire Games in Cardiff, Wales. A New Vote awarded Perth with a 9 to 7 vote.

Brisbane 1982 was awarded after Lagos, Nigeria; Kuala Lumpur, Malaysia and Birmingham, England all withdrew prior to the Bid vote that took place in Montreal, Quebec, Canada during the 1976 Summer Olympics.

Melbourne 2006 was awarded to the city after Wellington, New Zealand withdrew their bid prior to the Bid Lodgement Deadline.

Failed bid Results

Medals

Overall Medal Tally
Positions are calculated by the number of gold medals earned, then the number of silvers is taken into consideration and then the number of bronze.

Figures from Commonwealth Games Foundation website. Those represented in bold are the highest scoring medal tally for each individual medal.

The 2006 Games saw the highest overall medal tally, including the highest number of silver and bronze medals. The 1994 Games remains the Games with the highest number of gold medals won for Australia.

Games Summary

1911 Festival of the Empire
Australasian athletes representation

Commonwealth Games

Overall Medal Tally by Sport
Overall total of medals achieved for each individual Commonwealth Games sporting area from 1911-2018. Includes 1911 Festival of the Empire.

Progressive Medal Tally

Note - 1911 Games includes medals won by all Australasia athletes

Numbers of athletes and sports

This list shows the total number of athletes, male and female, and the total sports they were selected to compete in.

Team & Individual Competitor Achievements

Notable Achievements

Represented at most Games
Arthur Tunstall has represented Australia as an official at 8 Commonwealth Games (1962, 66, 70, 74, 78, 86, 90, 94).
Runner Steve Moneghetti has represented Australia as an athlete in four Games (1986, 1990, 1994, 1998) and an official at four Games (2002, 2010, 2014, 2018)
Donald Stockins has represented Australia as an official at 8 Commonwealth Games (1974, 78, 82, 86, 90, 94, 98, 2002).
Badminton player Rhonda Cator has represented Australia as an athlete in five Games (1986, 1990, 1994, 1998, 2002) and an official at three Games (2004, 2010, 2014)
Shooter Bruce Quick has represented in 7 Commonwealth Games (1990, 1998, 2002, 2006, 2010, 2014 and 2018)
Shooter Phillip Adams has represented in 6 Commonwealth Games (1982, 86, 90, 94, 98, 2002).
Shooter Russell Mark has represented in 6 Commonwealth Games (1990, 1994, 1998, 2002, 2006, 2010, 2014) 
Shooter James Corbett has represented in 6 Commonwealth Games (1986, 1990, 1998, 2006, 2010, 2014)
Squash player David Palmer has represented in 6 Commonwealth Games (1998, 2002, 2006, 2010, 2014, 2018)

Best Individual Medal Achievements

Most gold medals won
Swimmer Emma McKeon won 14 gold medals at three successive Games (2014, 18, 22).
Swimmer Susie O'Neill won 10 gold medals at three successive Games (1990, 94, 98).
Swimmer Ian Thorpe won 10 gold medals at two successive Games (1998, 2002).
Swimmer Leisel Jones won 10 gold medals at three successive Games (2002, 06, 10).

Most gold medals won at a single Games
Swimmer Susie O'Neill won 6 gold medals at the 1998 Games.
Swimmer Ian Thorpe won 6 gold medals at the 2002 Games.
Swimmer Emma McKeon won 6 gold medals at the 2022 Games.

Most medals won by a competitor
Swimmer Emma McKeon won 20 medals (14 gold, 1 silver, 5 bronze) at three Games (2014, 18, 22).
Shooter Phillip Adams has won 18 medals (7 gold, 9 silver, 2 bronze) at five Games (1982, 86, 90, 94, 2002).
Swimmer Susie O'Neill has won 15 medals (10 gold, 5 silver) at three Games (1990, 94, 98).
Swimmer Emily Seebohm has won 15 medals (7 gold, 4 silver, 4 bronze) at three Games (2010, 14, 18)
Shooter Bruce Quick has won 14 medals (1 Gold, 9 Silver and 4 Bronze) at 6 games (1990, 1998, 2002, 2006, 2010 and 2014).

Oldest gold medal winner
Dorothy Roche, was 61 years and 10 months old when she won a gold medal in the women's fours in Bowls at the 1990 Games.

Youngest gold medal winner
Jenny Turrall, was 13 years, 8 months old when she won a gold medal in the 400m freestyle at Christchurch, New Zealand in 1974.  Jenny Turrall also won Silver medals in the 200m Freestyle, 800m Freestyle and the women's 4x100 Freestyle Relay at the 1974 Christchurch Games.

Winning Streaks
Australia has won gold in the following events for each consecutive Games since the beginning of each individual streak.

Swimming, Men's 4 × 200 m (13 Games - 1954, 58, 62, 66, 70, 74, 78, 82, 86, 90, 94, 98, 2002)
Swimming, Women's 4 × 100 m Medley (9 Games - 1990, 94, 98, 2002, 06, 10, 14, 18, 22)
Swimming, Men's 4 × 100 m (6 Games - 1982, 86, 90, 94, 98, 2002)
Men's Hockey (7 Games - 1998, 2002, 06, 10, 14, 18, 22)

Australian Records Achieved at Commonwealth Games
Record Types listed follow this Key:
WR: World Record
CR: Commonwealth Record
AR: Australian Record
GR: Games Record

Record Summary

This list shows a summary of known Australian records and totals for each year and overall. A world record also covers all other records (Commonwealth, Australian and Games) but is not included in each individual tally. This also goes for each other section overlapping. The hierarchy is defined by the record key.

2002
6 World Records were set during these Games.
44 Commonwealth Games Records were set in the 2002 Games.

1998
20 Commonwealth Games Records were set in the 1998 Games.

1994
29 Commonwealth Games Records were set in the 1994 Games.

1990
7 Commonwealth Games Records were set in the 1990 Games.

1986
6 Commonwealth Games Records were set in the 1986 Games.

1978
2 Commonwealth Games Records were set in the 1978 Games.

1974
1 Commonwealth Games Records were set in the 1974 Games.

1970
3 Commonwealth Games Records were set in the 1970 Games.

1966
14 Commonwealth Games Records were set in the 1966 Games.

1962
5 Commonwealth Games Records were set in the 1962 Games.

1958
3 Commonwealth Games Records were set in the 1958 Games.

1950
2 Commonwealth Games Records were set in the 1950 Games.

1934
2 Commonwealth Games Records were set in the 1934 Games.

Notes

See also

Commonwealth Games Australia

References

External links 
 Commonwealth Games Federation
 Commonwealth Games Australia

 
Nations at the Commonwealth Games